Thor Halvorssen Hellum (locally , May 16, 1943 – July 20, 2014) was a Venezuelan-Norwegian businessman who served as CEO and President of the Venezuelan state-owned telephone company, CANTV and later as Special Commissioner for International Narcotic Affairs in the administration of President Carlos Andrés Pérez. In this post he held the rank of Ambassador. While investigating links to money laundering and drug trafficking, he was imprisoned on charges of terrorism; he was beaten and mistreated in prison, but later found innocent of all charges. Halvorssen's case was taken up by Amnesty International and several other international human rights organizations. The set-up of Halvorssen was reportedly payback for his investigations into presidential corruption, mafia activity, and the money laundering activities of Colombian drug kingpin Pablo Escobar.

Background and career
Halvorssen, of Norwegian descent, is one of the four sons of a Norwegian businessman, Øystein Halvorssen. His father became the president of GMAC (now Ally Financial) in Venezuela before he began his own business operations, and also served as the Norwegian Crown's consul-general in Caracas from 1938. According to the journalist Gaeton Fonzi, who wrote an investigative story about Halvorssen's life, he led the "jet-setting life style" of a "happy-go-lucky" son of a wealthy businessman. With his twin brother Olaf, he befriended Jerry Wolman, the owner of the Philadelphia Eagles football team. The three became partners in real estate transactions and night clubs. Halvorssen graduated from the University of Pennsylvania in 1966 and completed a Wharton School of the University of Pennsylvania MBA in 1969.

After graduating, Halvorssen returned to Caracas to help run the family businesses. Halvorssen’s commercial activities were wide-ranging and included ownership of Venezuelan insurance company AXXA Corretaje de Seguros, and representation of international conglomerates Dunlop, Ericsson, and British Cellophane. Halvorssen was also a real estate developer, owning the company that built the 350-room Melia Caribe hotel.

President Carlos Andres Pérez was elected in 1974 and in 1977 appointed Halvorssen, then 34, president of the Venezuelan state-owned telephone company CANTV; Halvorssen served as president and CEO of CANTV from 1978 until Pérez completed his term. At 36, Halvorssen became involved in community service, working at Venezuela's largest grant-giving charitable foundation, the Dividendo Voluntario Para La Comunidad for six years and serving as its President from 1976–1979. He started a program to build sports facilities in the poorest barrios with a focus on baseball.

In the 1980s Halvorssen focused his financial support for victims of human rights violations in Central America that had been ignored during the proxy wars between the Soviet Union and the United States by co-founding the Caracas-based Romulo Gallegos human rights organization from where he took up the causes of Nicaragua’s Miskito Indians and focused on violations of human rights by Marxist rebel groups throughout Central American and Colombia. Halvorssen participated in the creation and financing of the “alternative human right forums” that began in Geneva in the early 1990s. Halvorssen served on the boards of the Andrei Sakharov Institute and headed the Pan-American committee of the International Society for Human Rights.

When President Pérez was elected President again in 1989, he named Halvorssen Venezuela's Special Commissioner for anti-Narcotic Affairs with the rank of Ambassador.[4]

After government service Halvorssen lived in Miami where he was an active member of the Venezuelan opposition to the government of Hugo Chávez.

Venezuelan Government's "Anti-Drug Czar"

As chief of anti-narcotics, Halvorssen was behind the extradition to Italy of the Cuntrera-Caruana Mafia clan members Pasquale, Paolo and Gaspare Cuntrera. Gaeton Fonzi, former U.S. Senate investigator, wrote that "the remaining Mafia in Venezuela do not remember Halvorssen fondly for that". Halvorssen worked closely with Manhattan District Attorney Robert M. Morgenthau investigating the financial affairs of Venezuelan government officials. Halvorssen discovered the secret bank accounts of Venezuelan president Carlos Andrés Pérez, the man who had appointed Halvorssen. The evidence revealed $19 million that Perez and his mistress, Cecilia Matos, had deposited into numbered accounts.  This discovery and the airing of the evidence in Venezuela led to the impeachment of President Perez in May 1993.

When Pérez offered him the position of "drug czar", Halvorssen says he accepted because, "I went to a detoxification clinic in the US and I was so appalled by what I saw there that I resolved that I would do anything I could to fight drug trafficking."  According to Isabel Hilton, writing in the British edition of Gentleman's Quarterly (GQ), observers say that Pérez may even have offered Halvorssen the job as a necessary matching gesture when US president George H. W. Bush appointed William Bennett as his Director of National Drug Control Policy, thinking that Halvorssen was still drinking and wouldn't cause problems.  Halvorssen performed his duties well, deciding to use his worldwide contacts and intelligence connections to detail the extent of Venezuela's role in the drug world.  Halvorssen believed that Pérez wasn't responding to his reports on drug trafficking and money laundering and approached his ally, Venezuelan Senator Cristobal Fernandez Daló.  In 1992, he was appointed special overseas investigator of an Anti-Money-Laundering Commission by the Venezuelan Senate.  He was a liaison between law enforcement agencies around the world, working on drug and money-laundering cases.

Arrest and imprisonment
In 1993, while Halvorssen was investigating the now defunct Banco Latino and the Grupo Progreso, he was arrested and imprisoned for 74 days on charges of terrorism, which a Venezuelan congressman described at the time as a "set up because he was investigating Medellín Cartel finances and links to Venezuelan businessmen and officials."  Halvorssen was one of 12 people charged in a series of six bomb attacks in Caracas in July and August 1993. Police claimed the motive was profit—to capitalize on stock market fluctuations caused by the bombs. Halvorssen denied the charges and claimed he had made no stock or bond transactions in the Venezuelan stock market for two decades. One of the alleged members of the group of bombers, Ramiro Helmeyer, told police that Halvorssen was the leader of the conspiracy. Helmeyer recanted his confession, claiming that the police "tortured me so that I would accuse Thor Halvorssen". Although Halvorssen was ultimately released, Helmeyer was ultimately convicted of murder and sentenced to 30 years in prison.

Halvorssen was held without being charged for eight days. By the time he was released, he had still not been charged with a crime—the only thing that kept him in prison was an order of arrest signed eight days after his actual detention. Halvorssen was beaten and suffered from mistreatment while in the notorious Retén de Catia prison, ranked among the most cruel prisons in the world by human-rights organisations. International organizations, including Amnesty International, a Nicaraguan cardinal, and members of the British Parliament, protested Halvorssen case. Halvorssen was exonerated and his order of arrest rescinded.  No files were ever charged against him. After his release, the United Nations-affiliated International Society for Human Rights appointed him director of their Pan-American Committee. During his time in prison, when there was an all out media campaign against him, Halvorssen was supported by the New York District Attorney Robert Morgenthau who praised his efforts as someone who provided assistance to his office in the fight against the international narcotics business, as well as to federal law enforcement officials of the United States.

In 1994, Halvorssen wrote a Wall Street Journal editorial recounting his ordeal and explained that prior to his arrest he had been investigating Banco Latino for money laundering and for being a Ponzi scheme. Halvorssen explained that he was arrested in Caracas one day after a Banco Latino official asked him to come to Venezuela from New York for a meeting with the bank's chairman. Halvorssen was warned by a U.S. Treasury Department agent that the meeting with Banco Latino was a trap. Halvorssen went anyway and was arrested. Banco Latino went on to become the largest bank fraud in Venezuelan history.

In GQ magazine, Isabel Hilton also covers Halvorssen's investigation of Orlando Castro Llanes, a Venezuelan businessman of Cuban descent and owner of the Grupo Progreso. Hilton states that Castro was involved in arranging the false arrest of Halvorssen and the media campaign to destroy his reputation. According to Hilton, Castro was linked as a money laundering partner to drug kingpin Pablo Escobar in a letter written by Escobar to his attorney; the authenticity of the letter is questioned by Castro's attorney. Castro had visited Halvorssen in prison with his son who beat Halvorssen while he was handcuffed to a chair. Wire reports and newspaper articles written during his time in prison portrayed Halvorssen as guilty and corrupt. A framework of opinion was created to destroy any credibility Halvorssen could have when testifying in a court of law in the United States. Regarding the charges of terrorism she writes: "In reality, the police case against Halvorssen was non-existent…He was completely exonerated." Armando Valladares describes Halvorssen's decision to serve as anti-Drug Czar as "quixotic"  for having "simultaneously took on the entire banking sector without a budget or structural support in the government."

Intrigue and mutual accusations
Three weeks after Halvorssen's release, Banco Latino folded and its directors were charged with numerous crimes. They are still fugitives. Depositors lost billions of dollars. Orlando Castro Llanes fled Venezuela and was ultimately extradited from Miami to New York to face charges of grand larceny and theft.

Castro's own banks also collapsed leaving depositors unable to recuperate their savings. On April 4, 1996, Castro Llanes was indicted in New York by District Attorney Robert Morgenthau. Castro's son and grandson were also arrested on charges of a scheme to defraud in the first degree. They were also under investigation by the US Federal Reserve for laundering more than US$3 billion. The three Castros were convicted on grand larceny charges on February 19, 1997, and in April of that year sentenced to various prison terms. The larceny involved defrauding depositors of the Banco Progreso International de Puerto Rico of as much as US$55 million. His crime also cost the government of Venezuela more than US$8 million.

Charles Intriago—attorney for Orlando Castro and former federal prosecutor, as well as editor of Money Laundering Alert, the newsletter financed by Orlando Castro, and the well-known host of a biennial national money-laundering conference that attracts justice and law enforcement authorities, came to Castro Llanes’ defense and countered that Halvorssen ran a "smear campaign" and fed lies to US officials. It was later disclosed that Money Laundering Alert had received its seed money from Castro.  Intriago's activities came under investigation of the House Government Reform Committee where he repeatedly plead the Fifth Amendment when asked about his involvement with Castro and his own illegal campaign contributions to the re-election campaign of President Bill Clinton. Despite Intriago's claims that Castro was an honest businessman being smeared by Halvorssen, Castro was convicted and sentenced to prison in 1997. After completing his prison sentence Castro was extradited to Venezuela to stand trial for bank fraud. He was convicted and sent to El Junquito prison.

Movie rights
New York film producer Marla Shelton purchased the rights to Halvorssen's life story while working for Academy-Award winning director James Ivory of Merchant Ivory Productions. The script titled "Smoke and Mirrors" was written for the screen by Venezuelan architect and author Alex Ceppi.  Bestselling British investigative author David Yallop wrote a novel, Unholy Alliance, that included the story of his own involvement in Halvorssen's case.

Personal
Thor Halvorssen married Nelly Yanez de Halvorssen (1986-2014)

Halvorssen had three brothers: Stein, Erik, and Olaf.

Halvorssen Hellum's son is film producer and human rights activist Thor Halvorssen Mendoza, founder of the Human Rights Foundation, His nephew is Venezuelan political leader Leopoldo Lopez.

Death
Halvorssen Hellum died on July 20, 2014, due to a head injury suffered after a fall at his Miami home.

Notes
 Halvorssen Hellum is known commonly as Thor Halvorssen.  Per Venezuelan naming conventions, his full legal name includes both his father's (Halvorssen) and mother's (Hellum) surnames. His full, legal, Venezuelan name distinguishes him from his son, Thor Halvorssen Mendoza. (See Thor Halvorssen - Presidente. The Human Rights Foundation.  Retrieved on July 21, 2007.  Also see re: Francisco Usón—Political Prisoner and Prisoner of Conscience.  Human Rights Foundation.  Retrieved on July 21, 2007.)

1943 births
Living people
Ambassadors of Venezuela
Venezuelan businesspeople
Venezuelan people of Norwegian descent
Venezuelan twins